Slayback is a fictional character appearing in American comic books published by Marvel Comics. Primarily an enemy of Deadpool, the character exists within Marvel's main shared universe, known as the Marvel Universe. Created by writer Fabian Nicieza and artist Joe Madureira, the character first appeared in Deadpool: The Circle Chase #1 (August 1993).

Publication history 

After debuting in the four-issue miniseries Deadpool: The Circle Chase, Slayback went on to appear in Wolverine Annual 1995, Deadpool Vol. 3, #61-63, Death of Wolverine: The Weapon X Program #1, Deadpool vs. Thanos #3 and Deadpool & the Mercs for Money Vol. 1, #4.

Fictional character biography 

Claiming to have come from a wealthy and loving home, Australian-born Gregory Terraerton was at some point turned into a cyborg dubbed "Slayback" by the Weapon X Program. Slayback afterward became a mercenary and worked alongside fellow Weapon X members Deadpool, Garrison Kane, and Sluggo, as well as the mutant shapeshifter Copycat. Over time, Deadpool grew disgusted by Slayback's sociopathy and sadism and attempted to kill him by blowing him up, unaware that Slayback had regenerative abilities that, over a period of ten years, allowed him to recover from Deadpool's attack.

Obsessed with getting revenge on Deadpool, Slayback stole files pertaining to him from Department K and attempted to force Kane into revealing Deadpool's whereabouts. Next, Slayback, aware that Deadpool was among the mercenaries competing for Tolliver's inheritance, discerned that it was located in a Nepalese temple, where he captured Copycat. When Deadpool, Kane and Weasel arrived to claim Tolliver's treasure, Slayback attacked them and fatally wounded Copycat. The android Zero, who had been among Tolliver's belongings, was reactivated by the battle and disintegrated Slayback.

Slayback survived or was resurrected and went to work for Doctor Westergaard, who had Slayback capture Deadpool for use as a test subject for her experiments involving the Legacy Virus. Deadpool was rescued by Wolverine and Maverick while Slayback was abandoned and blown up by Westergaard.

Allison Kemp later hired Slayback and T-Ray to help her kill Deadpool. When Deadpool attacked Kemp's airship, Slayback paniced and attempted to flee via parachute pack, realizing too late that Deadpool had stuffed it full of explosives which detonated in mid-air as Slayback screamed, "Oh, fu-". Slayback was subsequently shown running amok in Hell during a period of cosmic imbalance caused by Death being imprisoned by Eternity.

A revived Slayback rejoined Weapon X and was seemingly killed yet again when a group of the organization's escaped test subjects stabbed and immolated him during Death of Wolverine. Slayback afterward appeared as one of the villains vying for the Rigellian Recorder acquired by Deadpool and the Mercs for Money. When questioned about his return by an annoyed Deadpool, Slayback merely quips, "The kind of money being offered for killing you... is worth crawling outta the grave for!"

Powers and abilities 

Physical and bionic augmentations provided by Weapon X have imbued Slayback with superhuman strength and durability, a healing factor, telescopic arms and enlargeable hands and fingers that can morph into razor sharp spikes and talons, respectively.

References

External links 

 Slayback at Comic Vine
 
 Gregory Terraerton at Marvel Wikia

Characters created by Fabian Nicieza
Characters created by Joe Madureira
Comics characters introduced in 1993
Fictional Australian people
Fictional characters who can stretch themselves
Fictional characters with superhuman durability or invulnerability
Marvel Comics cyborgs
Fictional henchmen
Fictional mercenaries in comics
Fictional murderers
Fictional torturers
Marvel Comics characters with accelerated healing
Marvel Comics characters with superhuman strength
Marvel Comics male supervillains
Deadpool characters
Cyborg supervillains